Marinko Petković (born 17 September 1976) is a Serbian former professional footballer who played as a striker.

Honours
Budućnost Banatski Dvor
 Serbia and Montenegro Cup: Runner-up 2003–04

References

External links
 
 

Association football forwards
Azerbaijan Premier League players
Expatriate footballers in Azerbaijan
First League of Serbia and Montenegro players
FK Banat Zrenjanin players
FK Budućnost Banatski Dvor players
FK ČSK Čelarevo players
FK Čukarički players
Khazar Lankaran FK players
People from Bačka Palanka
Serbia and Montenegro expatriate footballers
Serbia and Montenegro expatriate sportspeople in Azerbaijan
Serbia and Montenegro footballers
Serbian First League players
Serbian footballers
Serbian SuperLiga players
1976 births
Living people